Tunkhannock may refer to the following places in Pennsylvania:
Tunkhannock, Pennsylvania, a borough in Wyoming County
Tunkhannock Creek (Susquehanna River)
Tunkhannock Creek (Tobyhanna Creek)
Tunkhannock Viaduct, a railroad bridge in Wyoming County